The Moncton SportsDome is a sporting facility in Moncton, New Brunswick, Canada, that offers a variety of activities such as paintball, soccer, Laser tag, golf range and Canadian Football.

See also
 Moncton Sport Facilities

External links
Official Website

Sports venues in Moncton
Air-supported structures